The 1993 Hamilton Tiger-Cats season was the 36th season for the team in the Canadian Football League and their 44th overall. The Tiger-Cats finished in 2nd place in the East Division with a 6–12 record. After defeating the Ottawa Rough Riders in the East Semi-Final, the team appeared in the East Final, but lost to the heavily favoured Winnipeg Blue Bombers by a single point.

Offseason

CFL Draft

Preseason

Regular season

Season standings

Schedule

Postseason

Awards and honours

1993 CFL All-Stars

References

Hamilton Tiger-Cats seasons
Ham